Peppermint Crisp is a milk chocolate bar filled with a multitude of thin cylinders of mint-flavoured 'cracknel' (which is a brittle crystalline/sugar concoction extruded in fine hollow tubes). Invented in South Africa by Wilson-Rowntree in the 1960s, it was eventually bought out and manufactured by Nestlé South Africa. A hugely popular chocolate bar in South Africa for many decades, it is now part of that country's culture - not only as a confectionery item, but also as a popular topping used in baking and desserts. 

The Peppermint Crisp is sold in South Africa as both a 49 gram bar and a 150 gram slab. In New Zealand it is sold as a 49 gram bar, and in Australia as a 35 gram bar. 

In South Africa, it forms the basis of the Caramel-Peppermint Crisp Tart, a hugely popular South African ice box dessert. It is also popular as a topping on sponge cakes and cupcakes. Nestlé South Africa also sells an ice cream containing Peppermint Crisp shards, as well as a Peppermint Crisp dessert topping. Burger King South Africa sells a fusion dessert containing vanilla ice cream and shards of Peppermint Crisp while Krispy Kreme South Africa sells a popular Peppermint Crisp Tart gourmet doughnut. 

As in its native South Africa, the popular chocolate bar is also used as a crushed topping on pavlova cakes or other cakes in Australia and New Zealand.

Uses in cooking
The Peppermint Crisp can be used as an ingredient in mint chocolate cheesecakes and slices, and broken-up to decorate the top of pavlova meringue or cheesecake. James and Melanie Maddock used Peppermint Crisp on top of their dessert during a food challenge on the cooking show My Kitchen Rules.

References

External links
 

Chocolate bars
Nestlé brands
Australian confectionery